Karl Schroeder (born September 4, 1962) is a Canadian science fiction author and a professional futurist. His novels present far-future speculations on topics such as nanotechnology, terraforming, augmented reality, and interstellar travel, and are deeply philosophical. More recently he also focuses on near-future topics. Several of his short stories feature the character Gennady Malianov.

Biography
Schroeder was born in a Mennonite family in Brandon, Manitoba. In 1986 he moved to Toronto, where he now lives with his wife Janice Beitel and daughter.  After publishing a dozen short stories, Schroeder published his first novel, Ventus, in 2000. A prequel to Ventus, Lady of Mazes, was published in 2005.  He has published seven more novels and is co-author (with Cory Doctorow) of the self-help book The Complete Idiot's Guide to Publishing Science Fiction.  Schroeder currently writes, consults in the area of futures studies.

In October, 2011, Karl Schroeder was awarded a Master of Design degree in Strategic Foresight and Innovation from OCAD University in Toronto, Ontario, Canada.

Awards
 1982. Pierian Spring Best Story award for The Great Worm.
 1989. Context '89 fiction contest winner for The Cold Convergence.
 1993. Prix Aurora Award for Best Short Work in English for The Toy Mill.
 2001. New York Times Notable book for Ventus.
 2003. Prix Aurora Award for best Canadian SF novel for Permanence.
 2006/2007: Sun of Suns: Kirkus Best Book of 2006, 2007 Aurora finalist, 2007 nomination for the John W. Campbell Memorial award 
 2012. Audie Award for best Original Work for METAtropolis: Cascadia, a shared-world audiobook anthology in which Schroeder's contribution was the short story Deodand.

Selected bibliography

Stand-alone
 The Claus Effect (with David Nickle). (Tesseract Books, 1997)  
 Permanence (Tor Books, 2002.)  
 Crisis in Zefra (Directorate of Land Strategic Concepts, National Defence Canada; 2005.)  
 Lockstep (Tor Books, 2014.)

Ventus
 Ventus (Tor Books, 2000)  
 Lady of Mazes (prequel to Ventus) (Tor Books, 2005)

Virga
 Sun of Suns (Tor Books, 2006.)  
 Queen of Candesce (Tor Books, 2007.)  
 Pirate Sun (Tor Books, 2008.)  
 The Sunless Countries (Tor Books, 2009.)  
 Ashes of Candesce (Tor Books, 2012.)

References

External links

 Official site - including Creative Commons-licensed text of some of his works
 
 Permanence - An Adaptationist Solution to Fermi's Paradox? by Milan M. Cirkovic
 Adaptationism Fails to Resolve Fermi’s Paradox, Serbian Astronomical Journal, Vol. 170, pp. 89-100 (2005), by Milan Cirkovic with Ivana Dragicevic and Tanja Beric-Bjedov.
 Interview with Karl Schroeder - small WORLD Podcast 2006
 Video of Karl Schroeder on The Agenda with Steve Paikin, "Are We Bound for Space?" panel discussion with Chris Hadfield, Donna Shirley, Lawrence Krauss and Robert D. Richards
 Audio of Karl Schroeder, "The Rewilding: A Metaphor" presentation at the O'Reilly Media Open Source Conference.

1962 births
Living people
Analog Science Fiction and Fact people
Canadian science fiction writers
Mennonite writers
Writers from Brandon, Manitoba
Writers from Toronto
Creative Commons-licensed authors
Canadian male novelists
Canadian futurologists
OCAD University alumni
Canadian Mennonites